Mourning Has Broken is the third and final full-length album by the British thrash metal band, Sabbat, and the band's only album following the departure of singer and lyricist Martin Walkyier. The album is generally considered both a critical and commercial failure and the band split up soon after its release.

Speaking to Terrorizer magazine in 2006, Andy Sneap stated emphatically:  ""I don't listen to this (Mourning Has Broken). There is some mad guitar playing on there, some of the shredding is ridiculous, but it sounds thrown together, which it was; it shouldn't have had the Sabbat name on it."

The denial of the album's legitimacy indicated by its exclusion from the discography included in the band's official website as well as its exclusion from the 2007 remastered CD re-issue of the band's other two albums, means that the album cannot presently be considered canon.

Track listing
  "The Demise of History"   – 7:52 
  "Theological Void"  – 7:26 
  "Paint the World Black"  – 5:25 
  "Dumbstruck"  – 5:14 
  "The Voice of Time"  – 6:45 
  "Dreamscape"  – 8:47 
  "Without a Trace"  – 7:24 
  "Mourning Has Broken"  – 2:05

Personnel 
 Andy Sneap – lead guitar
 Richie Desmond – vocals
 Simon Negus – drums
 Wayne Banks – bass
 Neil Watson – guitar

References

1991 albums
Sabbat (English band) albums
Noise Records albums